The 6th Indian Infantry Brigade was an infantry brigade formation of the Indian Army during World War II. The brigade was a pre-war formation designated 6th (Lucknow) Infantry Brigade in India in September 1939. In November 1940, the brigade arrived in Singapore and come under the command of the 11th Indian Infantry Division. On the 22 December 1941, the brigade was absorbed into the 15th Indian Infantry Brigade after being almost destroyed at the Battle of Gurun on 15 December 1941 soon after the Battle of Jitra. What remained of the brigade surrendered to the Japanese on 15 February 1942, after the Battle of Singapore.

Composition
8th Field Regiment, Royal Artillery September 1939 to August 1940
1st Battalion, 8th Punjab Regiment September 1939 to December 1941
1st Battalion, 3rd Gurkha Rifles September 1939	 to January 1940
2nd Battalion, 10th Baluch Regiment September to October 1939 
2nd Battalion, Royal Welch Fusiliers September 1939 
3rd Battalion, 2nd Punjab Regiment September 1939 to January 1940
2nd Battalion, Royal Berkshire Regiment September 1939 to August 1940
2nd Battalion, 16th Punjab Regiment October 1939 to December 1941
2nd Battalion, 15th Punjab Regiment September 1940 to May 1941
1st Battalion, Seaforth Highlanders November 1940 to February 1941
2nd Battalion, East Surrey Regiment February 1941 to December 1941

See also

 Lucknow Brigade

References

Bibliography
 

Brigades of India in World War II
Military units and formations disestablished in 1941
Br